Didymograptidae is an extinct family of graptolites.

Genera
List of genera from Maletz (2014):

†Aulograptus Skevington, 1965
†Baltograptus Maletz, 1994
†Cladograpsus Geinitz, 1852
†Cymatograptus Jaanusson, 1965
†Didymograpsus M’Coy, 1851 in Sedgwick & M’Coy (1851)
†Expansograptus Bouček & Přibyl, 1951
†Janograptus Tullberg, 1880
†Jenkinsograptus Gutiérrez-Marco, 1986
†Parazygograptus Kozłowski, 1954
†Trigonograpsus Nicholson, 1869

References

Graptolites
Prehistoric hemichordate families